The Hepatitis B virus PRE stem-loop alpha (HBV PRE SL alpha) is an RNA structure that is shown to play a role in nuclear export of HBV mRNAs.

HBV PREalpha consists of a 30 nt stem-loop, with a 5 nt apical loop. The conserved stem-loop was predicted within the HBV PRE sequence and confirmed by mutagenesis.

The exact role of this structure in nuclear export has not yet been determined.

See also
Hepatitis B virus PRE beta
HBV RNA encapsidation signal epsilon
Hepatitis_B virus PRE 1151–1410

References

Cis-regulatory RNA elements
Hepatitis B virus